Diospyros rufa is a tree in the family Ebenaceae. Twigs are reddish when young. Inflorescences bear up to 10 flowers. The specific epithet  is from the Latin meaning "reddish", referring to the indumentum of the young twigs. Habitat is lowland mixed dipterocarp forests. D. rufa is found in Peninsular Malaysia and Borneo.

References

rufa
Plants described in 1906
Trees of Peninsular Malaysia
Trees of Borneo